Florian Illies (born 1971) is a German writer and art historian.

Life 
He was born and raised in the town of Schlitz in Hesse. His father was the biologist Joachim Illies, and one of his school teachers was the writer Gudrun Pausewang. He studied art history at the universities of Bonn and Oxford. He worked as culture editor for major German newspapers such as Frankfurter Allgemeine Zeitung and Die Zeit. In 2004, he cofounded the contemporary art magazine monopol with his wife Amélie von Heydebreck. In 2011, he became a partner at the Berlin-based auction house Villa Grisebach. In January 2019, he joined the Rowohlt Verlag publishing house as a managing director.

As a writer, Illies is known for his bestsellers Generation Golf (2000) and 1913: The Year Before the Storm (2012). The latter book has been translated into two dozen languages.

References

1971 births
Living people
Die Zeit people
Frankfurter Allgemeine Zeitung people
German art historians
German male writers